The fourth season of the tattoo reality competition Ink Master premiered on Spike on February 25 and concluded on May 20, 2014, with a total of 13 episodes. The show is hosted and judged by Jane's Addiction guitarist Dave Navarro, with accomplished tattoo artists Chris Núñez and Oliver Peck serving as series regular judges. The winner will receive a $100,000 prize, a feature in Inked Magazine and the title of Ink Master.

This season saw the return of season three contestant Kyle Dunbar, who originally finished the competition in 4th place.

The winner of the fourth season of Ink Master was Scott Marshall, with Walter "Sausage" Frank being the runner-up.

Judging and ranking

Judging panel
The judging panel is responsible for passing judgement on each artist. They collaborate and use information from their own perception, the audience vote, human canvas vote, and the winner's worst vote to determine who should be sent home. Weight of decisions is set by the terms of the challenge skill.

Audience voting
Audience voting, introduced in season two, is done through Facebook and Twitter using the available tattoos for vote on the Ink Master website. Voting will directly affect the contestant lineup for the following season; the contestant with the highest vote count will have the opportunity to return.

Human Canvas Jury
The canvases for the challenge gather after the tattoos are completed and vote on the best and worst of the days tattoos. While the primary judges have the final say, the weight of the canvas vote does affect the final decision of the judging panel.

Elimination Tattoo Winner's pick
This season allowed the winner of the elimination tattoo challenge to put a contestant in the bottom.

Contestants
Names, experience, and cities stated are at time of filming.

Notes

Contestants' progress

  The contestant won Ink Master.
 The contestant was the runner-up.
 The contestant finished third in the competition.
 The contestant advanced to the finale.
 The contestant was exempt from the first elimination.
 The contestant won Best Tattoo of the Day.
 The contestant was among the top.
 The contestant received positive critiques.
 The contestant received mixed critiques.
 The contestant received negative critiques.
 The contestant was in the bottom.
 The contestant was in the bottom and voted Worst Tattoo of the Day by the Human Canvas Jury.
 The contestant was put in the bottom by the Best Tattoo of the Day winner.
 The contestant was put in the bottom by the Best Tattoo of the Day winner and voted Worst Tattoo of the Day by the Human Canvas Jury.
 The contestant was eliminated from the competition.
 The contestant was voted Worst Tattoo of the Day and was eliminated from the competition.
 The contestant was put in the bottom by the Best Tattoo of the Day winner and was eliminated from the competition.
 The contestant was put in the bottom by the Best Tattoo of the Day winner, voted Worst Tattoo by the Human Canvas Jury and was eliminated from the competition.
 The contestant quit the competition.
 The contestant was disqualified from the competition.
 The contestant returned as a guest for that episode

Episodes
<onlyinclude><onlyinclude>

References

External links
Official website

2014 American television seasons
Season 4